The 2013–14 Sacramento Surge season was the second season of the Sacramento Surge professional indoor soccer club. The Sacramento Surge, a Pacific Division team in the Professional Arena Soccer League, played their home games in the Estadio Azteca Soccer Arena in the Natomas section of Sacramento, California. The team was led by general manager Ryan Hopping and head coach Jorge Fernandez.

Season summary
The Surge struggled early in the season, dropping their first six games in regulation with five of those losses by 7 or more goals. The team's fortunes improved in mid-December and early January as the team took Toros Mexico to overtime, beat the Turlock Express, and split a series with expansion Bay Area Rosal. Sacramento ended the season with another win over Turlock, earning them a 3–13 record.

The Sacramento Surge participated in the 2013–14 United States Open Cup for Arena Soccer starting with a Round of 32 victory over the Yamhill County Crew of the Premier Arena Soccer League and a Round of 16 loss to the Bay Area Rosal in a match that doubled as a regular PASL season contest.

History
In 1991 and 1992, Sacramento was home to the Sacramento Surge of the World League of American Football. The Surge won the 1992 World Bowl but, shortly afterwards, WLAF operations in the United States were suspended and the team disbanded. The soccer team is named in their honor.

Sacramento was a Professional Arena Soccer League expansion team for the 2012–13 season and they struggled to find their footing on the field. They placed last in the Pacific Division with a 2–14 record (and one of those wins a forfeit when the Tacoma Stars announced they would not travel for the final game of the regular season). The Surge participated in the 2012–13 United States Open Cup for Arena Soccer. They lost to the Turlock Express in the Wild Card round, abruptly ending their run in the tournament.

Schedule

Regular season

† Game also counts for US Open Cup, as listed in chart below.

U.S. Open Cup for Arena Soccer

References

External links
Sacramento Surge official website
Estadio Azteca Soccer Arena official website

Sacramento Surge (MASL)
Sacramento Surge
Sacramento Surge 2013
Sacramento Surge 2013